Themistocles Gluck (30 November 1853 in Iaşi, Moldavia – 25 April 1942 in Berlin) was a German physician and surgeon. He first invented endoprostheses from ivory in 1890 at Berlin, when he performed the first documented total wrist Arthroplasty. He received the 1st State Prize of the Berlin University for his work on nerve suturing and nerve regeneration. The French surgeons Louis Léopold Ollier and Jules Péan had already recognized Gluck's importance in the 1890s. With his laryngeal surgery, he achieved world renown. Nevertheless, it took a long time for him to receive the academic recognition he deserved as a non-university surgeon. It was not until he was 70 years old (1922) that he was made an associate professor and even nominated for the Nobel Prize (unsuccessfully, because his work was considered too old at the time).

References

 
 
 
 
 
 

 THEMISTOCLES GLUCK – O GÊNIO QUE INICIOU A ARTROPLASTIA (Osvandré Lech)

1853 births
1942 deaths
19th-century German people
20th-century German people
19th-century German physicians
German surgeons
Romanian surgeons
Romanian people of German descent
Physicians from Iași
Physicians from Berlin